The Kenosha Yacht Club of Kenosha, Wisconsin is located 50 miles north of Chicago on the western shore of Lake Michigan and is adjacent to the Southport Lighthouse on Simmons Island in downtown. The Kenosha Yacht Club is a member of US Sailing, Lake Michigan Yacht Racing Association, Lake Michigan Sail Racing Federation, and the Regional Sailing Association.

Kenosha Community Sailing Center 
The Kenosha Community Sailing Center (KCSC) is a collaborative effort between the Kenosha Yacht Club, local organizations and schools. Its goal is to educate Kenosha youth in the sport of sailing while integrating academic, leadership and life skills. The KCSC also promotes awareness of, and access to, the Kenosha Harbor and Lake Michigan's resources and environment for people of all ages through the sport of sailing.  Kenosha's lakefront is one of the most boater friendly on the great lakes.

History 
The Kenosha Yacht Club is one of the oldest organizations in Kenosha and was originally chartered in 1912. According to the best records that can be found, the first commodore was Buck Ferry.

In February 1918, a Mr. Peterson deeded all the land south of the Coast Guard headquarters and east to the lakeshore to the KYC. A building formerly used by the Jackson Lumber co. was sold to the KYC and moved to the site to serve as headquarters. However, in April 1921 the land was returned to Peterson who lost it to the City of Kenosha in November of that year.

Little is known of the KYC from 1921 until 1932 when it was incorporated under Commodore Alex Werner, who remained commodore for that year and then was re-elected for the years 1940 through 1943, the year the club was re-chartered.

From 1932 through 1946 the club met in the old Morgan Boat House. This building was erected in the early 1900s to serve as the Lake Michigan Base for J.P. Morgan’s steam yachts. In 1946 the Club was evicted from the boathouse and the building was to be torn down to make room for additional coal docks. After an extension of time, a club committee negotiated with the city for the site where the club stands today. They received a 20-year lease from the city and planned to move the boathouse to the site. However, before this could be accomplished, the boathouse burned down.

The insurance company paid the club $1800.00 for the boathouse fire damage. The KYC was given until April 1947 to tear down and remove the old building. Throughout the winter of 1946 the members managed to dismantle and save a large amount of lumber from the old boathouse. This lumber was moved to the new site in preparation for the new clubhouse.

In May 1947 the footings for the current clubhouse were poured and reconstruction began. With the help of the insurance money, walls, a roof, and a few permanent doors were added. A contractor erected the concrete blocks, but club members did much of the work themselves. It was a long process since it was necessary to complete the building piecemeal. As a few dollars were gathered, special meetings were called to determine what improvements deserved first consideration. The taproom was built first as it would help bring in needed money. The club did not keep a record of the members who put forth effort to create the club on Lake Michigan. Nels Nelson and Earl Nehls were the carpenter contractors who supervised and worked on the project.

In 1952 the club purchased a stiff leg derrick which allowed the storing of boats on the club grounds. Membership grew, as did the fleet.

During 1965, under the leadership of Commodore Cleve Ward, major changes were made at the club. The changes included a new entrance and foyer, a completely new galley, a remodeled dining room, and relocation of the rest rooms. All this was made possible by negotiating a long term lease extension from the city.

Other changes have occurred since then. The flagpole and plaque were installed during 1971–1972 under the leadership of Commodore Ed Werner. The bar, previously in the shape of a boat’s flaring bow and located in the middle of the clubhouse was replaced in 1972–1973 with the bar that exists today. The folding partitions replaced a permanent wall in 1975–1976 and the dance floor was installed. Member donations helped to fun a new roof and lighting installed in 1977–1978. In 1984 a gable roof was installed, replacing the flat roof.

Ladies Auxiliary 
The Ladies Auxiliary began in the mid-1940s, sometime after the club moved to its present location. Since women were not allowed to be members at that time, this served as their own club within the club. The women would accompany their husbands when they came for membership meetings, but then would have their own meetings upstairs. In those days, the women were required to have their husbands' permission to join the Auxiliary. At its peak, the Auxiliary had around 50 members and, truth be told, these women were the backbone of the club.

They organized parties for all occasions and events. Christmas parties for the children of KYC members complete with Santa arriving by a U.S. Coast Guard boat. They held fundraisers that raised money for everything from curtains for the clubhouse to donations to charities.

The women served dinner after each membership meeting. They organized monthly bowling events during the winter and Kentucky Derby parties complete with Mint Juleps in the spring. They had their own softball team, the KYC Admirals.

Within their meetings they planned many activities such as games and boating.

As with most clubs, the segregation of the sexes came to an end. In the late nineteen eighties, one of the women proclaimed that she too was a member and wanted to attend regular membership meetings.  That moment marked the beginning of the end  for the Ladies Auxiliary, but it also signaled a new beginning for the Club.

National Championship Regattas held at the Kenosha Yacht Club 
 The Class Association held the 1972 Thistle (dinghy) North American Championships at the Kenosha Yacht Club.
 The Mutineer 15 class Association held the 2006 Mutineer 15 National Championships at the Kenosha Yacht Club.
 The Buccaneer 18 Class Association hosted the 2011 Buccaneer 18 North American Championships in August 2011.

References

External links 
 Kenosha Yacht Club Official Site
 Kenosha Community Sailing Center Official Site
 US Sailing
 Lake Michigan Yacht Racing Association
 Lake Michigan Sail Racing Federation

1912 establishments in Wisconsin
Sports organizations established in 1912
Sailing in Wisconsin
Yacht clubs in the United States